Fab Lab is a British television programme designed for pre-school children. It was aired on the CBeebies channel from June 2002 until 15 October 2006, as well as CBeebies on BBC Two, although the series was put on hiatus between 19 December 2004 and 3 September 2005. It is an introduction to science, nature and technology for young children.

The program features two pixies named "Trixi" and "Dixi"  and a dog (male, breed unspecified) called "Prof". Trixi and Dixi are puppets while Prof is played by a human in a whole-body dog suit.

The two pixies live under the floor of a large garden shed known as the "Fab Lab". The shed is used as a laboratory by Prof who investigates various phenomena such as rainfall or the germination of plants. He explains features of the physical and natural world to the pixies, sometimes with the aid of a personal computer which Prof uses to show video sequences. Prof is very partial to green biscuits called "Pixiebicks" with which the pixies sometimes bribe Prof to expand his explanations.

At the end of the programme a whistle is heard, upon which Prof says that "Mrs Whistle" (presumably his owner) is calling, and leaves the shed.

Most episodes are now lost as the show has never been released on DVD.

Cast 

Dixi: Simon Buckley
Trixi: Kathy Smee
Prof: Siân Richardson (voiced by Jim Dunk)
Assistant Puppeteers:
Judith Bucklow
Hannah Proops

Animatronics Operator:
Daniel Carlisle

Writer & Creator 
Robyn Charteris

Writer
Christopher Lillicrap

References

External links
CBeebies - Fab Lab at bbc.co.uk

 The end-credits of the programme spell the names thus, however the CBeebies web page for the programme refers to "Trixie" and "Dixie"

2002 British television series debuts
2003 British television series endings
2000s British children's television series
BBC children's television shows
British preschool education television series
British television shows featuring puppetry
English-language television shows
Television series by Endemol
CBeebies